Jabal al-Bilas is a desert height located 500 meters (1,640 ft) above sea level in Syria.

A marker, laid by Roman governor Silanus 75 kilometres (47 mi) northwest of Palmyra, was found there, probably marking the Palmyrene's boundaries with Epiphania.

Occasional old pistachio trees of up to 5 meters in height can still be found there.

Syrian Civil War

On 19 April 2022, in the Al-Fasedah area, a landmine planted by Islamic State militants exploded, targeting a group of Pro-Assad soldiers, killing 3 of them and injuring 3 others.

References

Sources
 
  

Mountains of Syria